The Head of the Republic of Buryatia, formerly President of the Republic of Buryatia, is the highest state office within the  Republic of Buryatia, Russia, as it is the Head of State and Government. Since the dissolution of the Soviet Union, three people have served in this position.

History of office 
In October 1991, Leonid Potapov was elected chairman of the Supreme Soviet of Buryatia. He won the 1994 election, becoming the first President of the Republic. On 26 April 2011, the People's Khural (parliament) adopted amendments to the Constitution of Buryatia, renaming the office to the "Head of the Republic" from 2012.

List of officeholders

Timeline

Notes

References

External links 
Russian Administrative divisions

 
Politics of Buryatia
Buryatia